Rabbi Shlomo Baksht ( born 1960 in Petah Tikva) is an Israeli-Ukrainian rabbi. He serves as chief rabbi of Odessa and Odessa Oblast and as the head of Odessa's orthodox Jewish community. He contributedto the dissemination and popularization of traditional Jewish values among the Jews of Odessa.

In February 2022, during the conflict between Russia and Ukraine, Baksht launched an expedition aimed at helping hundreds of Ukrainian children reach a place of safety during the Russian invasion. Baksht's rescue operation was carried out in vehicles, although according to Judaism it is forbidden to drive on Shabbat, Bakshet had to do so to help those children.

Early life

Rabbi Shlomo Baksht was born in Petah Tikva, Israel, in 1960 to an Orthodox Jewish family. His father, Haim Menahem, was the deputy chief rabbi of the Israel Defense Forces. Baksht studied in Talmud Torah Sheret Israel, he then went on to study at Yeshiva Of Israel, where he studied with a disciple of Jewish sage Hafetz Haim, rabbi Yakov Naiman. Later, he enrolled in yeshiva Nahalat David, which was founded by rabbi Boruch Shimon Salamon, chief rabbi of Petah Tikva at the time. Baksht married in 1985 (5 children and 5 grandchildren) and moved to Jerusalem.

Career 
In 1991 he along with his brother Dov founded kolel, Lamed Torah. He taught there until 1993 when he moved to Odessa by invitation of the Jewish community. In 1994 he founded a Jewish school, and two years later a boarding-school for foreign students. In 1998 the Jewish community of Odessa moved to open a new synagogue that is located in the heart of town at the intersection of Rishelevskaya and Evreyskaya. Daily prayers, holiday seminars and lectures on Jewish traditions are offered. In 2000 a mikveh was constructed. 

In 2003 Baksht created the Jewish University of Odessa which enrolls over 200 students. In 2010 he created yeshiva Ateret Hameleh. Graduates from Ateret Hameleh are now teaching and studying in Yeshivas of Israel and CIS.

References

External links
 Интервью с главным раввином города Одессы и Одесской области
 Одесса (еврейская община) :: Ежевика — еврейская академическая вики-энциклопедия
 Tikva - Childrens Home
 "Chibur" - Odessa "Ohr Sameakh"

1960 births
Living people
20th-century Israeli rabbis
People from Petah Tikva
Odesa Jews
21st-century Ukrainian rabbis
Israeli Orthodox rabbis
20th-century Ukrainian rabbis
Clergy from Odesa